City Bomber is a vehicular combat arcade video game developed and distributed by Konami and released in 1987.

Gameplay
In City Bomber, the arcade flyer states that the player is in pursuit of a gang of criminals. However, the in-game cut scenes show that the player is a criminal involved in a shooting at a casino and is trying to evade cars from the casino and from the police. In order to escape, the player must reach checkpoints within a specified amount of time. The last stage of the game shows the car boarding an airplane that flies away. At the start of the game, the player's car can shoot missiles at enemy vehicles and is also able to jump over enemies or obstacles. When some enemy cars are destroyed, power-ups are released that augment the car's abilities. Missiles improve the destructive power of the car's weaponry, wings extend the car's jumping distance, rocket boosters speed up the car and buzzsaws allow the car to ram obstacles without damage for a short time.

Collisions with other cars are not generally harmful to the player, although they may slow down the car. Oil slicks dropped by enemies will spin out the car and slow it down significantly. Collisions with obstacles or falling off the course will destroy the player's car. While the player has an unlimited supply of cars, crashes will cost the player time and the new car will lose all previously-collected power-ups. If the player does not reach the checkpoint (shown by a map on the left side of the screen) in time, the game is over.

Points are scored by destroying enemy cars, with bonus points awarded at the end of each course for the amount of time remaining.

Reception 
In Japan, Game Machine listed City Bomber on their January 15, 1988 issue as being the twentieth most-successful table arcade unit of the month.

Legacy 
The game's Soundtrack was produced by Konami Kukeiha Club and published by King Records on July 21, 1989 as part of "Konami Game Music Collection Vol.0" along additional soundtracks from Flak Attack (MX 5000), The Main Event, The Final Round, Gang Busters, and Devastators.

References

External links

City Bomber at Arcade History

1987 video games
Arcade video games
Arcade-only video games
Konami games
Vehicular combat games
Konami arcade games
Video games developed in Japan